DD-carboxypeptidase may refer to:
 Muramoylpentapeptide carboxypeptidase, an enzyme
 Zinc D-Ala-D-Ala carboxypeptidase, an enzyme
 DD-transpeptidase, an enzyme